Kilaulay (Scottish Gaelic: Cill Amhlaigh  / Cill Amhlaidh ) is a crofting township on the island of South Uist, in the Outer Hebrides of Scotland. Kilaulay is also within the parish of South Uist.

Etymology
Kilaulay is an Anglicised form of the Scottish Gaelic Cill Amhlaigh (or Cill Amhlaidh), meaning "Amhlaigh'''s church" (or "Amhlaidh's church"). There is however no Gaelic saint who bears this name. In some cases the personal name Amhlaigh/Amhlaidh is a Gaelicisation of the Old Norse name Óláfr, so Kilaulay could possibly be dedicated to a Norse "Olaf".

Chapel burial ground
The RCAHMS lists Kilaulay as the site of where a chapel and burial ground once stood. In the 19th century publication Origines Parochiales Scotiae, a chapel is said to have once stood at Kileulay ("Kilaulay"). The burial ground is supposedly that of a Danish princess named Aula or Olaff, who drowned while being caught in a storm off Uist. In May 1965, the site was visited and its location was confirmed by the tenant of Kilaulay farm. There was however no local knowledge of a church or chapel. At the time of the visit, the boundaries of the burial ground were no longer visible.

Supposed tradition of Kilaulay
According to an entry which appeared within the 19th century monthly periodical The Celtic Magazine'', a tradition relating to Kilaulay existed at the time.

See also
South Uist
St Olaf

Notes

References

External links

Geograph images of the area around Kilaulay

Villages on South Uist